Lundgaard is a Danish surname. Notable people with the surname include: 

Christian Lundgaard (born 2001), Danish racing driver
Hans Petter Lundgaard (born 1935), Norwegian jurist
Henrik Lundgaard (born 1969), Danish rally driver
Jesper Lundgaard (born 1954), Danish jazz bassist and composer
Sara Lundgaard (born 1997), Danish badminton player